Kyle Richard White (born 2004) is an English professional footballer who plays for Fleetwood Town, as a midfielder.

Career
White was born in Burnley, Lancashire but was raised in Haslingden, Lancashire and attended Haslingden High School in the town. He started playing football for his local side Junior Hoops from the age of five and stayed with the club till the age of fifteen, turning down trials with professional clubs. He subsequently signed for the youth team at AFC Darwen where he won the Lancashire County Cup. It was at Darwen that he was spotted by a scout at Blackpool and he was invited on a six-week trial, however, this proved to be unsuccessful. He subsequently returned to playing youth team football for Darwen and also played men's football for Haslingden St Marys, but the Darwen youth team disbanded in the summer of 2021.

Following his release he signed for North West Counties Football League Division One North side A.F.C. Blackpool for the 2021–22 season, playing for both the under-18 side and first team. He played a part in the FA Youth Cup run playing against West Didsbury & Chorlton and Wrexham and also scored one goal in fourteen appearances for the first team.

On 3 January 2022, he signed for EFL League One side Fleetwood Town on a short-term deal until the end of the 2021–22 season following a successful trial in December, with the club holding the option of a further year. He went straight into the under-18 side managed by Simon Wiles. White made his professional debut for Fleetwood on 6 August 2022, when he came on as a second half substitute for Brendan Sarpong-Wiredu in the 2–1 win over Plymouth Argyle in EFL League One at the Highbury Stadium.

Career statistics

References

2004 births
Living people
Footballers from Burnley 
A.F.C. Blackpool players
Fleetwood Town F.C. players
North West Counties Football League players
English Football League players
Association football midfielders
English footballers